Bruno Martins Teles (born 1 May 1986), known as Bruno Teles, is a Brazilian former footballer who played as a left back.

Career
Born in Alvorada, Tocantins, Teles began his career at Grêmio. He also had loans to Portuguesa, Sport Recife and Juventude.

In February 2010, he moved abroad for the first time, signing for Portugal's Vitória de Guimarães until the end of the Primeira Liga season. He moved on again in September 2012 for Krylia Sovetov of the Russian Premier League on a two-year deal; the fee was estimated at €1 million with Vitória getting a 30% share and the player himself the rest.

Teles signed for Vasco da Gama, the club he supported as a boy, for the last four months of the 2015 Campeonato Brasileiro Série A, but did not play. At the start of the new year, he signed for Mogi Mirim for the 2016 Campeonato Paulista. In June, he joined América Mineiro for the national league campaign.

On 13 January 2017, Teles came back to Portugal's top flight, joining Rio Ave on an 18-month deal. He scored once for the club, a last-minute winner in a 2–1 home victory against Vitória Setúbal on 30 September.

Remaining in Northern Portugal, Teles signed a two-year deal for Paços de Ferreira on 1 July 2018, and won promotion from the LigaPro in his first season.

In July 2021, he signed with Chaves.

Honours
Grêmio
Campeonato Gaúcho: 2007

Krylia Sovetov
Russian Professional Football League: 2014–15

References

External links

1986 births
Living people
Sportspeople from Tocantins
Brazilian footballers
Campeonato Brasileiro Série A players
Grêmio Foot-Ball Porto Alegrense players
Associação Portuguesa de Desportos players
Sport Club do Recife players
Esporte Clube Juventude players
CR Vasco da Gama players
Mogi Mirim Esporte Clube players
América Futebol Clube (MG) players
Vitória S.C. players
PFC Krylia Sovetov Samara players
Rio Ave F.C. players
F.C. Paços de Ferreira players
Associação Académica de Coimbra – O.A.F. players
G.D. Chaves players
Primeira Liga players
Russian Premier League players
Liga Portugal 2 players
Brazilian expatriate footballers
Brazilian expatriate sportspeople in Portugal
Brazilian expatriate sportspeople in Russia
Expatriate footballers in Portugal
Expatriate footballers in Russia
Association football defenders